Michele J. Gelfand is an American cultural psychologist. She is both a  professor of organizational behavior and the John H. Scully professor of cross-cultural management at the Stanford Graduate School of Business, and – by courtesy – a professor of psychology at the School of Humanities and Sciences of Stanford University. She has published research on tightness–looseness theory.

Education and career 
Gelfand graduated from Colgate University with a B.A. in psychology in 1989. In 1996 she completed a PhD in social psychology and organizational psychology at the University of Illinois, Urbana-Champaign, where she studied under Harry Triandis. She was on the faculty of New York University from 1995 to 1996, and worked at the University of Maryland, College Park from 1996.

She is an editor of Advances in Culture and Psychology, which she co-founded; Psychology of Conflict and Conflict Management in Organizations; and The Handbook of Negotiation and Culture. She was the president of the International Association for Conflict Management from 2009 to 2010.

Research 

Gelfand has published work on the influences of culture on conflict and resolution and on revenge and forgiveness. She has worked on theoretical frameworks such as individualism–collectivism and tightness–looseness theory; her book on this topic, Rule Makers, Rule Breakers: How Tight and Loose Cultures Wire Our World, was published in 2018. In 2021 she had an h-index of 54, according to Scopus.

Awards and honors 

 Distinguished Early Career Contribution Award, Society for Industrial and Organizational Psychology (2002)
 Cummings Scholarly Achievement Award, Academy of Management Organizational Behavior Division (2002)
 Outstanding Article of the Year Award, International Association for Conflict Management (2009, 2004, and 2001)
 Distinguished University Scholar-Teacher, University of Maryland, College Park (2009)
 Best Paper Award for New Directions, Academy of Management Conflict Management Division (2009)
 Anneliese Maier Research Award, Alexander von Humboldt Foundation (2011)
  Gordon Allport Intergroup Relations Prize, Society for the Psychological Study of Social Issues (2012)
  William A. Owens Scholarly Achievement Award, Society for Industrial and Organizational Psychology (2014)
  Carol and Ed Diener Award in Social Psychology, Society for Personality and Social Psychology (2015)
  Outstanding International Psychologist Award, American Psychological Association (2017)
  Fellow, American Academy of Arts and Sciences (2019)
  Member, U. S. National Academy of Sciences (2021)

References 

American women psychologists
21st-century American psychologists
American women writers
Living people
Stanford University faculty
University of Maryland, College Park faculty
Year of birth missing (living people)
Cultural psychologists
Members of the United States National Academy of Sciences
21st-century American women